Rupert William Penry-Jones (born 22 September 1970) is a British actor, known for his performances as Adam Carter in Spooks, Clive Reader in Silk, DI Joseph Chandler in Whitechapel, and Mr Quinlan in the American horror series The Strain.

Early life 
Penry-Jones was born in London, the son of Welsh actor Peter Penry-Jones and English actress Angela Thorne. His brother, Laurence Penry-Jones, is an actor turned ambulance driver who is married to actress Polly Walker.

On BBC One's Who Do You Think You Are?, broadcast in August 2010, it was revealed that Penry-Jones' maternal grandfather, William, had served with the Indian Army Medical Corps at the Battle of Monte Cassino and that his earlier ancestors had a long-standing connection with the Indian Army. Penry-Jones also discovered that he had Indian ancestry from the early 19th century.

Penry-Jones was educated at Dulwich College in Dulwich, London, until the age of 19 when he was enrolled at Bristol Old Vic Theatre School.
He was thrown out of Bristol Old Vic "for having a bad attitude".

Career 
In 1995, Penry-Jones appeared with his mother on television in Cold Comfort Farm.

Penry-Jones made his London stage debut at the Hackney Empire theatre in 1995 playing Fortinbras to Ralph Fiennes's Hamlet in an Almeida production of Hamlet. He was cast as Richard in the premiere staging of Stephen Poliakoff's Sweet Panic at Hampstead Theatre in 1996. The following year he appeared in both The Paper Husband at Hampstead Theatre, and as the upper-class Pip Thompson in a revival of Arnold Wesker's Chips with Everything on the Lyttelton stage at the Royal National Theatre.

In 1998, he created the role of the Boy in Edward Albee's The Play About the Baby at the Almeida Theatre. In 1999, he joined the Royal Shakespeare Company at Stratford-upon-Avon, playing the title role in Don Carlos at The Other Place theatre, and Alcibiades in Timon of Athens at the Royal Shakespeare Theatre. Both productions transferred to the Barbican Centre in London, where his performance as Don Carlos won the 1999 Ian Charleson Award.

in 2001 he was cast as Robert Caplan in J.B. Priestley's thriller "time-play" Dangerous Corner opposite Dervla Kirwan, who played Olwen Peel at the West Yorkshire Playhouse, Leeds. The production then transferred for a four-month run at the Garrick Theatre in London's West End. From July to October 2003 at the National's Cottesloe Theatre he played the leading role of Louis XIV in Nick Dear's historical drama Power. Penry-Jones returned to the theatre at the end of 2009 playing the role of Carl in Michael Wynne's new play The Priory at the Royal Court Theatre, London, from 19 November 2009 to 16 January 2010.

On television, Penry-Jones has played barrister Alex Hay in C4's ten-part serial North Square in 2000; Donald Maclean in the BBC's four-part production of Cambridge Spies in 2003; and Grimani in Russell T. Davies' production of Casanova in 2005. In 2004, he joined the cast in series 3 of the BBC's BAFTA-winning series Spooks. He played the lead role of section leader Adam Carter for four series before leaving the show in 2008. He won a ITV3 Crime Thriller Award for his role in Spooks in 2008. He also went on to play the role of Captain Wentworth in ITV's adaptation of Persuasion.

In 2008, he starred with Bradley Whitford and Neve Campbell in Burn Up playing an oil executive who becomes embroiled in the politics surrounding global warming and oil stocks. He played Richard Hannay in the BBC adaptation of The 39 Steps.

In February 2009, Penry-Jones took the lead in an ITV drama, Whitechapel, a three-part thriller based on the copycat killings of Jack the Ripper. Whitechapel was the highest-performing new drama in 2009. A second series of the show based around the Kray twins was broadcast in autumn 2010; the third series began in January 2012. The fourth and last series aired in September 2013.

From 2012-2014, Penry-Jones was also cast opposite Maxine Peake in a legal drama Silk created by Peter Moffat. The show revolves around two barristers, played by Penry-Jones and Peake who are competing to become QCs. Series 2 aired in 2012 and Series 3 premiered on 24 February 2014. He also joined the cast of the film A Little Chaos with Kate Winslet as Antoine. The film was directed by Alan Rickman.

From 2014–2017 he joined the cast of Guillermo del Toro's The Strain, playing a main role as Mr.Quinlan, a vampire-human hybrid (on the side of humans), intent on killing his father... The Master. Playing Mr.Quinlan involved wearing prosthetics and a lot of make-up, for 29 episodes over 3 seasons, something Penry-Jones admitted he would not consider again in television.

In 2020, the release of the first trailer for The Batman revealed that he had an as-yet unannounced role in the film, later reported to be that of Gotham City Mayor Don Mitchell, Jr.

In 2022, Penry-Jones starred as Mike/Toby in ITV 1's drama Our House alongside Martin Compston and Tuppence Middleton.

Personal life 
Penry-Jones married Irish actress Dervla Kirwan in August 2007, following a three-year engagement. They had met in 2001 at a production of J. B. Priestley Dangerous Corner. They have two children. His brother Laurence is married to TV and film actress Polly Walker.

Filmography

Film

Television

References

External links 
 

1970 births
20th-century English male actors
21st-century English male actors
Male actors from London
Alumni of Bristol Old Vic Theatre School
English male film actors
English people of Welsh descent
English male stage actors
English male television actors
English male voice actors
Living people
People educated at Dulwich College
British people of Anglo-Indian descent
Royal Shakespeare Company members
English male Shakespearean actors
Ian Charleson Award winners